The 3rd Infantry Division, also known as Spearhead Division is a unit of the Philippine Army, based at Camp Gen Macario Peralta Jr in Jamindan, Capiz, Philippines.

History
The 3rd Infantry Division, Philippine Army was established and they stationed at the general headquarters on Camp General Macario Peralta Jr in Jamindan, Capiz. The local troopers of the PA 3rd Infantry Division was sending the combat operations in Visayas region and the engagements of the Anti-Communist Operations and aiding the supported of the Philippine National Police against the Communist rebel groups of the New People's Army and all local element criminals.

The local government soldiers and officers of the Philippine Army 3rd Infantry Division was sending the combat operations in the Visayas Region from the main battles and invasion commands and helping the CAFGU militia groups and the supporting of the Philippine National Police and they fought against the communist rebel fighters of the New People's Army and they some local element criminals.

Current Units
The Brigades under the 3rd Infantry Division:
 301st Infantry (Bayanihan) Brigade, based in the town of Dingle, Iloilo
 302nd Infantry (Achiever) Brigade, based in Tanjay City, Negros Oriental
 303rd Infantry (Brown Eagle) Brigade, based in Murcia, Negros Occidental

The Battalions under the 3rd Infantry Division:
 11th Infantry (Lapu-Lapu) Battalion
 15th Infantry (Molave Warrior) Battalion                           
 47th Infantry (Katapatan) Battalion
 61st Infantry (Hunter) Battalion
 62nd Infantry (Unifier) Battalion
 79th Infantry (Masaligan) Battalion                         
 
 82nd Infantry (Bantay Laya) Battalion
 94th Infantry (Mandirigma) Battalion

The Support Units under the 3rd Infantry Division:
 3rd Civil Military Operations Battalion
 3rd Division Training School
 3rd Division Training Unit
 6th Forward Service Support Unit

Operations
 The division's operations area covers the entire Western Visayas region, and the province of Negros Oriental in the Philippines. Its primary mission is counter-insurgency against local communist guerrilla operations, as well as supporting the Philippine National Police in combating organized crime.

References
 Official Site of the PA 3ID. http://www.army.mil.ph/Army_Sites/INFANTRY%20DIVISIONS/3ID

External links
 http://www.adroth.ph/tracker/army.htm
 Official website

3
Military units and formations established in 1946